Yun-hyeong, also spelled Yoon-hyung, is a Korean unisex given name. Its meaning differs based on the hanja used to write each syllable of the name. There are 16 hanja with the reading "yoon" and 21 hanja with the reading "hyung" on the South Korean government's official list of hanja which may be registered for use in given names.

People with this name include:
 Lee Yoon-hyung (1979–2005), South Korean Samsung heiress
 Oh Youn-hyung (born 1984), South Korean male rugby player
 Song Yun-hyeong (born 1995), South Korean male singer

See also
List of Korean given names

References

Korean unisex given names